Pieter-Jan van Lill (born 4 December 1983 in  Keetmanshoop, South-West Africa) is a Namibian rugby union player. Van Lill was on the Namibian squads for the 2011, 2015 & 2019 Rugby World Cup.

He started his French rugby career with Dax in July 2014 where he stayed for 1 season and played 21 games for the Landes team.

van Lill joined Aviron Bayonnais in 2015 where he played 99 games during his 5 season at Bayonne.

References

External links

1983 births
Living people
People from Keetmanshoop
Rugby union number eights
Namibian rugby union players
Namibian expatriate rugby union players
Expatriate rugby union players in France
Namibian expatriate sportspeople in France
Namibia international rugby union players
US Dax players
Aviron Bayonnais players
White Namibian people
Namibian Afrikaner people